Clifty Creek is a stream in Gasconade County in the U.S. state of Missouri. It is a tributary of the Big Berger Creek. 

Clifty Creek was so named due to the cliffs along its course.

See also
List of rivers of Missouri

References

Rivers of Gasconade County, Missouri
Rivers of Missouri